Écho et Narcisse (Echo and Narcissus) is a 1779 drame lyrique in three acts, the last original opera written by Christoph Willibald Gluck, his sixth for the French stage. The libretto, written by Louis-Théodore de Tschudi, tells the story of the love between Echo and Narcissus.

Performance history
Écho et Narcisse was first performed on 24 September 1779 by the Paris Opéra in the second Salle du Palais-Royal. The opera is in the pastoral tradition, a genre not in favor at the Opéra at the time, and it was a failure, discontinued after only 12 performances. Gluck decided to go back to Vienna and never returned to Paris. He revised the work for 8 August 1780, but this version only enjoyed nine performances.

A third version was presented to the public on 8 June 1781. This was better received. However, it was infrequently produced until René Jacobs revived it in 1987 at the Schwetzingen Festival. Jacobs used the revised version as the original one has not survived, except for the libretto.

Roles

Synopsis
The nymph Écho is loved by Narcisse, but also desired by Apollo. Apollo puts a spell on Narcisse so he falls in love with his own reflection, but Cupid is eventually successful in securing a happy ending by re-uniting Écho and Narcisse.

References
Notes

Sources
 Lajarte, Théodore, [https://archive.org/stream/bibliothquemusi01lajagoog#page/n340/mode/2up/ "Écho et Narcisse"], Bibliothèque Musicale du Théatre de l'Opéra. Catalogue Historique, Chronologique, Anecdotique, Paris, Librairie des bibliophiles, 1878, pp. 311–312, vol. I 
 Rushton, Julian (2001). "Christoph Willibald Gluck", pp. 313–327, in The New Penguin Opera Guide, edited by Amanda Holden. London: Penguin Books. .

Further reading
Hayes, Jeremy (1992), "Écho et Narcisse" in The New Grove Dictionary of Opera'', ed. Stanley Sadie (London)

External links
 
 Libretto (French)
 Score

Operas by Christoph Willibald Gluck
French-language operas
1779 operas
Operas
Operas based on classical mythology
Opera world premieres at the Paris Opera
Operas based on Metamorphoses